South Canterbury is a former parliamentary electorate, in South Canterbury, New Zealand. It existed for three parliamentary terms from 1969 to 1978.

Population centres
Through an amendment in the Electoral Act in 1965, the number of electorates in the South Island was fixed at 25, an increase of one since the 1962 electoral redistribution. It was accepted that through the more rapid population growth in the North Island, the number of its electorates would continue to increase, and to keep proportionality, three new electorates were allowed for in the 1967 electoral redistribution for the next election. In the North Island, five electorates were newly created and one electorate was reconstituted while three electorates were abolished. In the South Island, three electorates were newly created (including South Canterbury) and one electorate was reconstituted while three electorates were abolished. The overall effect of the required changes was highly disruptive to existing electorates, with all but three electorates having their boundaries altered.

In the 1967 electoral redistribution, the  electorate move significantly north, and most of that electorates area came to the South Canterbury electorate. In the south, some area was gained from the  electorate. Rural land that was previously with the  electorate was also absorbed. The electorate was rural and settlements included Mount Somers, Mount Cook Village, Albury, Burkes Pass, Fairlie, Kimbell, Lake Tekapo, Twizel, Geraldine, Pleasant Point, Kurow, and Waimate.

In the 1972 electoral redistribution, the southern boundary shifted slightly north, and Kurow and Waimate transferred to the  electorate. In the 1977 electoral redistribution, South Canterbury was abolished. Its area was roughly evenly split between the Ashburton electorate, which moved south again, and the reconstituted Waitaki electorate.

History
Rob Talbot had since the  been the representative of the Ashburton electorate for the National Party. When the South Canterbury electorate was formed in 1969, he transferred to there. With the abolition of the South Canterbury electorate in 1978 after three parliamentary terms, Talbot transferred back to the Ashburton electorate.

Members of Parliament
Key

Election results

1975 election

1972 election

1969 election

Notes

References

Historical electorates of New Zealand
1969 establishments in New Zealand
1978 disestablishments in New Zealand